SM Entertainment is a South Korean entertainment company established in 1995 by Lee Soo-man. It is currently one of the largest entertainment companies in South Korea. The company operates as a record label, talent agency, music production company, event management and concert production company, and music publishing house.

The label is currently home to prominent K-pop artists such as Kangta, BoA, TVXQ!, Super Junior, Girls' Generation, J-Min, Shinee, Zhou Mi, Exo, Red Velvet, NCT, and Aespa. Some of the artists formerly under contract with them are H.O.T., Fly to the Sky, Shinhwa, TraxX, Zhang Liyin, S.E.S., CSJH The Grace, f(x), and Henry Lau. 

In Japan, SM Entertainment co-publishes Avex Trax releases for artists including Ayumi Hamasaki, Namie Amuro, and Koda Kumi, as well as Johnny's Entertainment artists such as Arashi and KAT-TUN.

Discography

1990s

2000s

2000

2001

2002

2003

2004

2005

2006

2007

2008

2009

2010s

2010

2011

2012

2013

2014

2015

2016

2017

2018

2019

2020s

2020

2021

2022

2023

See also 
 Label SJ discography
ScreaM Records discography

References 

discography
Pop music discographies
Discographies of South Korean record labels